Kitui Central Constituency is an electoral constituency in Kenya. It is one of eight constituencies in Kitui County. The constituency was established for the 1963 elections.

Members of Parliament

Wards

References 

Constituencies in Kitui County
Constituencies in Eastern Province (Kenya)
1963 establishments in Kenya
Constituencies established in 1963